International Insurance Company (Azerbaijani: Beynəlxalq Sığorta Şirkətinin) ("ICC") is an insurance company based in Baku, Azerbaijan.
In the Azerbaijani language, it is called Beynəlxalq Sığorta Şirkətinin.
The company was founded by the International Bank of Azerbaijan.

In the fall of 2013, the company received the "Best Insurance Company in 2013″ award from International Finance magazine. ICC was the only insurance industry company in Azerbaijan to receive the award.

Company Overview

Products
The company provides 34 types of insurance products.

Individual insurance services:
 Accident
 Car
 Property
 Travel

Business insurance services:
 Accident
 Air transport
 Cargo
 Construction
 Liability
 Machinery
 Marine
 Property
 Vehicle

Market

 As of February 2013, the company ranked sixth in Azerbaijan in volume of claims paid.
 Approximately 65% of the company’s business is related to health insurance.

Financial Performance
Financials (2012):
 Aggregate capital: 8.87 million
 Aggregate liabilities: 13.33 million
 Assets: AZN 22.2 million
 Expenses: 16.44 million
 Net profit: 574.7
 Revenue: 17.18 million
 Utilized authorized capital: 8.8 million

As of July 2012, the company’s overall capital amounted to AZN 5.5 million.

In 2009, the company was rated by Moody’s Investors Service and scored a “B2 (outlook: stable)” in the insurance company financial strength category.

Present

People
Management:
 Sultanov Jamil - Chairman of the Board of Directors
 Jalil Nihad - Head of the Executive Office

Location
ICC’s headquarters is located at J. Jabbarly str., 40C, Baku, Azerbaijan 1065

Affiliations
In July 2013, the company became a member of the Association of Risk Professionals of Azerbaijan.

Past

History
 The company was founded in 2002.
 One of the company’s first medical insurance contracts was with the Central Clinical Hospital in Azerbaijan in 2003. ICC had offered four different coverage levels.

See also
 Azerbaijan
 Insurance
 International Bank of Azerbaijan

External links
 ICC (Azerbaijani) site 
 ICC (English) site
 ICC (Russian) site

References

Companies based in Baku
Financial services companies established in 2002
Insurance companies of Azerbaijan
Azerbaijani brands